The fifth season of the American reality series Bar Rescue aired on Spike on August 7, 2016 and ended on September 17, 2017 with a total of 31 episodes. The first three episodes aired at 9/8c before moving to 10/9c for the remainder of the season.

Experts
Jon Taffer – Host/Star/Bar Consultant
Samantha "Sam" Taffer – Host's Daughter/Mixologist/Recon Spy

Chefs

Ryan Scott
Aaron McCargo
Jason Santos
Vic Vegas
Tiffany Derry
Michael Ferraro

Mixologists
Lisamarie Joyce
Shawn Ford
Rob Floyd
Phil Wills
David Vaughn
Mia Mastroianni
Daniel Ponsky
Ashley Clark
Derrick Turner

Production
In May 2015, Taffer confirmed on his Facebook that a fifth season was in the works. On July 27, 2016, Spike greenlit the fifth season along with a late-night talk show pilot from Taffer. Season 5 also featured ten new Back to the Bar episodes with never-before-seen footage of the experts visiting the previously rescued bars in addition to Taffer revisiting past confrontations with the memorable owners he faced during his visit.

Episodes

Notes

References

External links

Bar Rescue Updates — Unaffiliated site that keeps track of bars being open or closed and has updates for each bar

2016 American television seasons
2017 American television seasons
Bar Rescue